Juhi Chaturvedi (born 1975) is an Indian screenwriter who works in Hindi films. An advertising professional based in Mumbai, Chaturvedi has written scripts for Bollywood films Vicky Donor (2012), Piku (2015), October (2018) and Gulabo Sitabo (2020).

She won the 2013 Filmfare Award for Best Story for Vicky Donor (2012), the National Film Award for Best Original Screenplay and Best Dialogues and the 2016 Filmfare Award for Best Screenplay for Piku (2015).

Early life and background
Born and brought up in Lucknow, Chaturvedi graduated from Lucknow College of Arts.

Career
Chaturvedi started her career as a freelance illustrator with The Times of India Lucknow edition. She shifted to Delhi in 1996, when she joined advertising with Ogilvy & Mather as an art director. In 1999, she moved to Mumbai office of the agency. In 2008, she joined McCann followed by Bates in Mumbai, where she was creative director. She worked with director Shoojit Sircar on ad films for brands like Titan watches and Saffola. She also wrote the dialogues for Shoebite, Sircar's second film, which had Amitabh Bachchan in the lead role, but it got cancelled.

During her stay in Delhi, she lived in Lajpat Nagar, an experience she used in scripting her first film, Vicky Donor. She was awarded the IRDS Film award for social concern for her story Vicky Donor.

In July 2013, she joined advertising agency, Leo Burnett Mumbai as Executive Creative Director.

Filmography

Accolades

References

External links
 

1975 births
Living people
Indian columnists
Indian women screenwriters
Filmfare Awards winners
Indian advertising people
Writers from Lucknow
Women writers from Uttar Pradesh
21st-century Indian women writers
21st-century Indian writers
21st-century Indian dramatists and playwrights
Screenwriters from Uttar Pradesh
Best Original Screenplay National Film Award winners
Best Dialogue National Film Award winners
Indian women columnists
University of Lucknow alumni
21st-century Indian screenwriters